Nepal Samajbadi Party (Lohiyabadi) ('Nepal Socialist Party (Lohiaist)') is a political party in Nepal. As of 2013, the president of the party was Bimal Prasad Argadiya Yadav. The party registered itself with the Election Commission of Nepal ahead of the 2013 Constituent Assembly election, with the support of 10,000 voters. It presented 8 candidates in FPTP constituencies, 3 from Dhanusa district, 3 from Parsa district, 1 from Bara district and 1 from Mahottari district. For the Proportional Representation vote the party submitted a list of 36 candidates, headed by Bimal Prasad Argariya Yadav. The election symbol of the party is a chair.

References

Political parties with year of establishment missing
Socialist parties in Nepal